David Matthew Grannell (born October 4, 1952) is a former American football tight end in the National Football League (NFL) who played for the San Diego Chargers. He also played college football at Arizona State University.

References 

Living people
Arizona State Sun Devils football players
1952 births
American football tight ends
San Diego Chargers players